Associação Desportiva Guarabira, commonly known as Desportiva Guarabira, is a Brazilian football club based in Guarabira, Paraíba state.

History
The club was founded on May 2, 2005, after Guarabira Esporte Clube folded. Desportiva Guarabira won the Campeonato Paraibano Second Level in 2009.

Achievements
 Campeonato Paraibano Second Level:
 Winners (1): 2009

Stadium
Associação Desportiva Guarabira play their home games at Estádio Municipal Sílvio Porto. The stadium has a maximum capacity of 3,000 people.

References

Association football clubs established in 2005
Football clubs in Paraíba
2005 establishments in Brazil